Brewster Lake is a lake on Vancouver Island northwest of Campbell Lake and north west of the city Campbell River.

Brewster lake is a part of a chain of lakes within the Sayward Forest Canoe Route.  One of three largest lakes on the route, Brewst paddle with a 0.3 km portage at the most southern tip to Gray Lake and a 2.3 km portage at the most northern shores to Surprise Lake. Brewster is well known for its year round good fishing for cutthroat and rainbow trout and Dolly Varden.

References

External links 
The Sayward forest Canoe Route:  https://www.gocampbellriver.com/files/MapsForDownload/SaywardForestCanoeRouteMap.pdfAlberni Valley
Lakes of Vancouver Island
Sayward Land District